Steven C. Johnson (November 29, 1965) is an American politician serving as the 42nd Kansas State Treasurer since January 9, 2023. He a member of the Kansas House of Representatives representing the 108th district in Saline County, Kansas from 2011 to 2023. A Republican, he was first elected in 2010 and served as chairman of the House Taxation Committee.

References

External links
Vote Smart Steven Johnson

|-

 

1965 births
21st-century American politicians
Kansas State University alumni
Living people
State treasurers of Kansas
Republican Party members of the Kansas House of Representatives
People from Saline County, Kansas
University of Chicago alumni